The 2005 Chennai floods were some of the worst floods to have hit the city of Chennai, India. The floods occurred during the North-East monsoon season (November-December 2005) as a result of heavy rain. Over 50 people were killed in two incidents of stampede for food and money in relief camps.

See also
2005 December Chennai Stampede
2005 November Chennai Stampede
Disaster Management Act, 2005
2015 South Indian floods

Why The Flood Was Dangrous 
The chennai flood was damaged many houses leaving people on the streets. The flood also killed many which affected multiple families.

References 
 

2005 disasters in India
2005 in India
Floods in India
2005 floods in Asia
2000s in Chennai
2000s in Tamil Nadu
Disasters in Tamil Nadu